The Etymological Dictionary of the German Language is a reference book for the history of the German language, and was one of the first books of its kind ever written. Originally written in 1883 by Friedrich Kluge, it is still actively maintained and considered a standard work among the German etymological dictionaries. The most recent publication was released in 2011 in print, eBook and as an Android app.

Editions and editors

History 
From the 10th to the 13 editions, between 1924 and 1943, there was a dedication on the flyleaf that read: "To the German people its German dictionary."

In the 1980s, criticism grew about the state of the dictionary. It was argued that it had not been maintained with sufficient rigor and was partially outdated. One of the supporting arguments was that the 21st edition (1975) when compared to the previous edition had remained unchanged. As a result of this criticism a new editor for the dictionary was selected, Elmar Seebold.

Influence

After the publication and success of the 1st edition in 1883, Etymological Dictionary of the German Language became a major source, reference and format guide for etymological dictionaries of other languages. Examples:

Dutch – Etymologisch Woordenboek der Nederlandsche Taal' (1892) by Johannes Franck
Old Norse – Etymologisk Ordbog over det norske og det danske sprog (1885) by Hjalmar Falk and Alf Torp
Swedish – Svensk etymologisk ordbok (1922) by Elof Hellquist
English – An etymological dictionary of the English language (1893) by Walter William Skeat
Danish – Dansk etymologisk ordbog'' by Niels Åge Nielsen

References

External links
 

1883 non-fiction books
German dictionaries